Fraser Valley Action is a Canadian soccer team based in Langley, British Columbia, Canada. Founded in 1993, the team plays in Pacific Coast Soccer League (PCSL), a national amateur league at the fourth tier of the American Soccer Pyramid, which features teams from western Canada and the Pacific Northwest region of the United States of America.

The team plays its home matches in the Spartan Complex Stadium on the campus of Trinity Western University, where they have played since 2007. The team's colors are white, black and green.

History

The team was developed under the auspice of Athletes in Action (AIA), a Christian ministry organization, and serves as a community that promotes the integration of faith and sport. The team played as Abbotsford AIA until 2000, played as Athletes in Action FC in 2001, and adopted its current name prior to the beginning of the 2002 season.

Players

Current roster

Year-by-year

Honors

Head coaches
  Pat Rhola (2007; 2009–present)

Stadia
 Spartan Complex Stadium; Langley, British Columbia (2007; 2009–present)

Average attendance

External links
 Fraser Valley Action

Soccer clubs in British Columbia
Association football clubs established in 1993
Pacific Coast Soccer League teams
1993 establishments in British Columbia